is a town located in Tochigi Prefecture, Japan. ,  the town had an estimated population of 11,777 in 4503 households, and a population density of 68 persons per km2.

Geography
Motegi is located on the far eastern border of Tochigi Prefecture.

Surrounding municipalities
Tochigi Prefecture
 Nasukarasuyama
 Mashiko
 Ichikai
Ibaraki Prefecture
 Hitachiōmiya
 Kasama
 Sakuragawa
 Shirosato

Climate
Motegi has a Humid continental climate (Köppen Cfa) characterized by warm summers and cold winters with heavy snowfall.  The average annual temperature in Motegi is 13.1 °C. The average annual rainfall is 1410 mm with September as the wettest month. The temperatures are highest on average in August, at around 25.1 °C, and lowest in January, at around 2.0 °C.

Demographics
Per Japanese census data, the population of Motegi peaked in the 1950s and has declined steadily over the past 70 years. It is now less than half what it was a century ago.

History
The town of Motegi, and the villages of Sakagawa, Nakagawa and Sudo were created within Haga District on April 1, 1889 with the creation of the modern municipalities system. The three villages were annexed by Motegi on August 1, 1954.

Government
Motegi has a mayor-council form of government with a directly elected mayor and a unicameral town council of 14 members. Motegi, together with the other municipalities in Haga District collectively contributes two members to the Tochigi Prefectural Assembly. In terms of national politics, the town is part of Tochigi 4th district of the lower house of the Diet of Japan.

Economy

Education
Motegi has four public primary schools and one public middle school operated by the town government. The town has one public high school operated by the Tochigi Prefectural Board of Education.

Transportation

Railway
Mooka Railway – Mooka Line
 -

Highway

Local attractions
Motegi is the site of the Mobility Resort Motegi, a complex built by Honda which hosts all types of car and go-cart racing, the Honda Collection Hall transport museum, a resort-style hotel, and the "Hello Woods" camping and nature area.

The Nissan Proving Grounds for testing off-road vehicles are also located in Motegi.

References

External links

Official Website 

Towns in Tochigi Prefecture
Motegi, Tochigi